This is a list of frozen food brands. Frozen food is food that is frozen from the time it is produced to the time it is 
either defrosted or cooked by the consumer, or eaten while still frozen.

Frozen food brands

 Amy's Kitchen
 Aunt Bessie's
 Banquet Foods
 Bellisio Foods
 Birds Eye
 Bubba Foods
 Dr. Praeger's
 Earthbound Farm
 Eggo
 El Charrito
 Elbtal
 Felix
 FarmRich
 Findus
 Freezer Queen
 Frikom
 FRoSTA
 Fry Group Foods
 Gorton's of Gloucester
 Green Giant
 Groupe Doux
 Healthy Choice
 Hilcona
 Hortex
 Hot Pockets
 Hungry Man
 Iglo
 K&N's Foods
 Kangaroo Brands
 Kart's
 Kid Cuisine
 Kidfresh
 King of Pops
 Lean Cuisine
 Lender's Bagels
 M&M Meat Shops
 Marie Callender's
 Maxaroni
 McCain Foods
 Morton Frozen Foods
 Mrs. Smith's
 Ore-Ida
 Pepperidge Farm
 Perdue Farms
 Ramly Group
 Ross Group
 Steak-umm
 Stouffer's
 SuperFresh
 Swanson
 Tee Yih Jia (Spring Home, Happy Belly, Master Chef)
 Tyson Foods (Tyson Looney Tunes Meals)

Frozen desserts

Ice cream

Frozen pizza brands

 Bagel Bites
 California Pizza Kitchen
 Celeste
 DiGiorno
 Dr. Oetker
 Ellio's Pizza
 Fiestada
 Freschetta
 Grandiosa
 Palermo's Pizza
 Pizza Pops
 Red Baron
 Richelieu Foods
 Tombstone
 Totino's
 Uno Chicago Grill

See also
 List of brand name food products
 List of food companies

References

External links 
 

 
Frozen foods